Upton is a small village and civil parish in the West Lindsey district of Lincolnshire, England. The population of the civil parish at the 2011 census was 456.

References

External links

Upton Village web site. Retrieved 13 August 2011

Villages in Lincolnshire
Civil parishes in Lincolnshire
West Lindsey District